Taylor Mountain may refer to

 Mountains in the USA:
 Taylor Mountain (Alabama)
 Taylor Mountain (Alaska)
 Taylor Mountain (Arkansas)
 Taylor Mountain (Madera County, California)
 Taylor Mountain (Modoc County, California)
 Taylor Mountain (Sonoma County, California)
 Taylor Mountain (Boulder County, Colorado)
 Taylor Mountain (Chaffee County, Colorado)
 Taylor Mountain (Idaho/Montana)
 Taylor Mountain (Bingham County, Idaho)
 Taylor Mountain (Lemhi County, Idaho) (two in this county)
 Taylor Mountain (Wayne County, Kentucky)
 Taylor Mountain (Whitley County, Kentucky)
 Taylor Mountain (Massachusetts)
 Taylor Mountain (Judith Basin County, Montana)
 Taylor Mountain (Lake County, Montana)
 Taylor Mountain (New Mexico)
 Taylor Mountain (Orange County, New York)
 Taylor Mountain (Warren County, New York)
 Taylor Mountain (Essex County, New York)
 Taylor Mountain (Oklahoma)
 Taylor Mountain (Oregon)
 Taylor Mountain (Tennessee)
 Taylor Mountain (Bandera County, Texas)
 Taylor Mountain (Lampasas County, Texas)
 Taylor Mountain (Milam County, Texas)
 Taylor Mountain (Utah)
 Taylors Mountain (Bedford County, Virginia)
 Taylor Mountain (Washington)
 Taylor Mountain (Wyoming) (two in Teton county)

See also
 Taylor Peak (disambiguation)